Véronique is a French feminine given name (etymologically derived from the Latine name Veronica). It may refer to:

Véronique Ançay (born 1970), Swiss ski mountaineer
Véronique Augereau (born 1957), French voice actress
Véronique Béliveau (born 1955), Canadian actress and pop/rock singer
Veronique Belleter (born 1977), Belgian cyclist
Véronique Besse (born 1963), French politician
Véronique Boiry (born 1948), French illustrator
Véronique Bonnecaze, French pianist
Veronique Branquinho (born 1973), Belgian fashion designer
Véronique Brisy (born 1960), Belgian swimmer
Véronique Brouquier (born 1957), French fencer
Véronique Chankowski (born 1971), French historian
Véronique Cloutier (born 1974), French Canadian TV and radio personality
Véronique Delobel (born 1978), French retired competitive ice dancer
Véronique Genest (born 1956), French actress
Véronique Gens (born 1966), French soprano
Véronique Jannot (born 1957), French actress and singer
Véronique Louwagie (born 1961), French politician
Véronique Mang (born 1984), track and field sprint athlete
Véronique Marot (born 1955), English former elite long-distance runner
Véronique Mathieu (born 1955), French politician and Member of the European Parliament
Véronique Müller (born 1948), Swiss singer
Véronique Sanson (born 1949), French singer
Véronique Silver (born 1931), French actress
Véronique Tadjo (born 1955), Ivorian writer, poet, novelist and artist
Véronique Vendell (born 1942), French actress

See also 
 Veronica (name)

French feminine given names